Bracken Creek is a small, mostly intermittent stream in Webster County, Missouri. It is a tributary of the Osage Fork Gasconade River.

The stream headwaters are northeast of Bracken and it flows north then northwest roughly parallel to Missouri Route JJ to its confluence with Osage Fork south of Route M and east-southeast of Niangua.

Bracken Creek has the name of the local Bracken family. The Brackens settled near the creek in about 1850.

See also
List of rivers of Missouri

References

Rivers of Webster County, Missouri
Rivers of Missouri